Boutefeu was one of a dozen s built for the French Navy in the first decade of the 20th century.

Design and description
The Bouclier class were designed to a general specification and varied significantly from each other in various ways. Designed to displace , they displaced  at normal load. Their crew numbered 80–83 men.

Boutefeu was powered by a pair of Zoelly steam turbines, each driving one propeller shaft using steam provided by four water-tube boilers. Boutefeu handily exceed that speed, reaching  during her sea trials.

The primary armament of the Bouclier-class ships consisted of two  Modèle 1893 guns in single mounts, one each fore and aft of the superstructure, and four  Modèle 1902 guns distributed amidships. They were also fitted with two twin mounts for  torpedo tubes amidships.

Construction and career
Boutefeu was ordered from Dyle et Bacalan and was launched from its Bordeaux shipyard on 2 May 1911. The ship was completed later that year. During the First World War she was stationed at Brindisi in support of the Otranto barrage.

On 15 May 1917, during the Battle of the Strait of Otranto, Boutefeu struck a mine laid earlier that day by the Imperial German Navy submarine UC-25 just outside Brindisi harbor. The destroyer broke in two and sank in under two minutes, with heavy loss of life.

References

Bibliography

 

Bouclier-class destroyers
Ships built by Dyle et Bacalan
1911 ships
Maritime incidents in 1917
Ships sunk by mines
World War I shipwrecks in the Mediterranean Sea